Été 67 (Summer of 67; the name is inspired by the 1967 Summer of Love) is a rock band created in 1998 in Esneux (near Liège), Belgium. They generally sing in French, but also do some covers in English (like I'm Waiting for the Man, Venus in Furs or Simple Twist of Fate, Soul of a Man) and Dutch. They musically sound between The Smiths and Jacques Dutronc, with a singer inspired by Bertrand Cantat of Noir Desir.

They are now one of the most popular live acts in French-speaking Belgium.

The Belgian label Team for action (distribution "Bang!") released on April 13, 2005 a first untitled EP including the song Le quartier de la gare  which became quite popular on Belgian radios. Their first untitled LP was released on March 3, 2006, with a special 2 CDs edition released on March 27, 2007.

They signed with the French independent label Wagram Music, and released an eponymous EP and LP during summer 2007 with different track listings.

They record their second album during summer 2009 in Brussels and Paris.

Members
 Nicolas Michaux - vocals, guitar
 Raphaël Breuer - guitar, singer
 Bryan Hayart - drums, percussion
 Nicolas Berwart - bass
 Renaud Magis - guitar, backing vocals
 Xavier Dellicour - saxophone, clarinet, flute, musical keyboard, harmonica

Discography 

 Le répondeur
 Le p'tit diable
 Les pilules
 Terre inconnue (version 1)
 Terre inconnue (version 2)

Released on April 13, 2005
 Le quartier de la gare
 Sens unique
 Suite d'accords
 Générique 67

Released on March 3, 2007
 Les pilules
 Dis-moi encore
 Le quartier de la gare
 Eva
 Marcher droit
 Tu n'es pas là
 Si vous voulez de moi
 Chinese restaurant
 Le petit diable
 Autodestruction massive
 Je suis un égoïste
 I'm waiting for the man (Back To Mono #2) -- Velvet Underground cover
 Les vacances à la plage

Released on March 27, 2007
CD 1
 Les pilules
 Dis-moi encore
 Le quartier de la gare
 Eva
 Marcher droit
 Tu n'es pas là
 Si vous voulez de moi
 Chinese restaurant
 Le petit diable
 Autodestruction massive
 Je suis un égoïste
 I'm waiting for the man (Back To Mono #2) -- Velvet Underground cover
 Les vacances à la plage
 Tout ce que je veux
 On nous cache tout, on nous dit rien -- Jacques Dutronc cover
 Dis moi encore (#2)
 Souvenirs
 Voir un ami pleurer \ Een vriend zien huilen -- Jacques Brel cover, duet with Franck vander Linden (from De Mens; studio recording from the 0110 live act)
CD 2 (DVD Bonus)
 Dis-moi encore (video)
 Dis-moi encore (making of)
 Les vacances à la plage (vidéo)

Released on June 18, 2007
 Le quartier de la gare
 Les pilules
 Autodestruction massive
 Générique 67

Released on August 27, 2007
 Les pilules
 Dis-moi encore
 Le quartier de la gare
 Eva
 Marcher droit
 Tu n'es pas là
 Tout ce que je veux
 Si vous voulez de moi
 Chinese restaurant
 Le petit diable
 Autodestruction massive
 Je suis un égoïste
 On nous cache tout, on nous dit rien -- Jacques Dutronc cover
 Les vacances à la plage

Released on March 27, 2010
 Passer la frontière
 Plus tôt que prévu
 Hôtel Delirium # 9
 Dans ma prison
 Une vie saine (duet with Antoine Wielemans (Girls in Hawaii)
 Crime passionnel
 Quelque chose à part
 Drogue douce
 Loin d'ici
 Le cow-boy tout nu
 Romans de gare
 Le pourboire
 Sans rêves
 Retour à Élisabethville

References

External links
 Biography in English
 Official website of the band
 Official website of the label

Belgian rock music groups
Belgian pop music groups
Esneux